, formally known as , was a video game production company headquartered in Oyama, Tochigi, Japan. It was founded in 1972 as a subsidiary of Universal Entertainment. On November 1, 1983, the company was renamed to "UPL Co. Ltd". UPL filed for bankruptcy in March 4, 1992.

Near the end of UPL's business, Tsutomu Fujisawa later established a new video game company called Scarab, which renamed itself several years later as feelplus. Fujisawa died in February 28, 1998.

Notable works

Arcade
 Mouser (released in North America by Cosmos)
 Nova 2001 (released in North America by Universal)
 Ninja-kun Ma-jou no Bouken (released by Taito)
 Penguin-kun Wars
 Raiders5
 XX Mission (released in North America by United Artists Theatre Amusements)
 Ark Area
 Mutant Night
 Ninja-Kid II (released in the USA by World Games as Rad Action, and by United Amusements as JT-104)
 Atomic Robo-Kid (released in North America by Nikom)
 Omega Fighter (released in North America by American Sammy Corporation)
 Otogizoushi Urashima Mahjong
 Task Force Harrier (released in North America by American Sammy Corporation)
 Bio-ship Paladin (released in North America by American Sammy Corporation)
 US-AAF Mustang
 Vandyke
 Acrobat Mission
 Black Heart
 Koutetsu Yousai Strahl

Game Boy
 Ninja Taro (published outside of Japan by American Sammy)

Sega Mega Drive/Sega Genesis
 Atomic Robo-Kid (ported by Treco)
 Bio-ship Paladin (ported by Treco)

Sharp X68000
 Atomic Robo-Kid (ported by System Sacom)

Super NES
 Acrobat Mission (ported by Teichiku)
 Super Ninja-kun (published by Jaleco)

TurboGrafx-16/TurboGrafx-CD
 Atomic Robo-Kid Special
 Gomola Speed

See also
 Jaleco

References

External links
UPL-Grave Digger: The legend begins once more... - a grave website created by UPL employees dedicated to the company. 
UPL Co., Ltd profile at MobyGames

Defunct video game companies of Japan
Video game companies established in 1972
Video game companies disestablished in 1992
Companies that have filed for bankruptcy in Japan
Japanese companies established in 1972
Japanese companies disestablished in 1992
Hamster Corporation